The  coppery-naped puffleg (Eriocnemis luciani sapphiropygia) is a subspecies of hummingbird found in the Andes in Peru in wet montane forest edges between 2000 and 4000 m altitude. It is usually considered a subspecies of the sapphire-vented puffleg,  Eriocnemis luciani.

References

Handbook of the Birds of the World. Vol. 5, J. del Hoyo, A. Elliott & J. Sargatal (eds.), Barcelona, 1999
Hummingbird splits

coppery-naped puffleg
Birds of the Peruvian Andes
Endemic birds of Peru
coppery-naped puffleg